The Abongshan Formation is dated to the Late Cretaceous period and consists of red sandstone. A majority of the formation is located in the northern part of the Tibetan Autonomous Region in China.

References

Geology of Tibet
Upper Cretaceous Series of Asia